George Richards was an American lawyer and politician from New York.

Biography
He lived in Warrensburgh, New York.

He was District Attorney of Warren County from 1847 to 1850.

He was a member of the New York State Assembly (Warren Co.) in 1852.

He was a member of the New York State Senate (14th D.) in 1854 and 1855.

Sources
The New York Civil List compiled by Franklin Benjamin Hough (pages 137, 144, 244, 299 and 384; Weed, Parsons and Co., 1858)

Year of birth missing
Year of death missing
Members of the New York State Assembly
New York (state) state senators
People from Warrensburg, New York
New York (state) Whigs
19th-century American politicians
County district attorneys in New York (state)